Trevor Henry Elliott (31 December 1937 – 15 June 2019) was an Australian rules footballer who played with Essendon and Footscray in the Victorian Football League (VFL). 

His brother, Morrie also played league football for South Melbourne.

Notes

External links 		
		
		
		

2019 deaths		
1937 births		
Australian rules footballers from Victoria (Australia)		
Essendon Football Club players		
Western Bulldogs players
Seymour Football Club players